Kerry Hardie is an Irish poet and novelist.

Life and work
Kerry Hardie was born in Singapore in 1951, and lived in Bangor, County Down and was educated in the University of York. Today she is married to Seán Hardie a writer and TV executive and living in Kilkenny. She worked for the BBC Northern Ireland and the Arts Council of Northern Ireland. She has won a wide number of poetry awards and scholarships and residencies have taken her to countries including Australia, France and China. She is a member of Aosdána.

Awards

 Hennessey Award for Poetry, joint winner, 1995
 UK National Poetry Award, 1996
 Michael Hartnett Award, joint winner, 2005
 Women's National Poetry Prize, Twice winner
 The Patrick and Kathleen Kavanagh Award 
 The Lawrence O’Shaughnessy Award for Poetry, Minnesota. [2014]

Jennifer Matthews, in Poetry International (q.d.; 2011)

‘Hardie’s poetry is brave, steadily confronting both the deaths of her loved ones and her own experiences with illness as an ME sufferer. Her collections contain gentle, but insistent, works of memento mori ... What makes her work exceptional is how skilfully she illustrates the connection between humanity and the cycles in the natural world. Poems and lives move through the unstoppable clockwork of seasons in her collections… A unique aspect of Hardie’s poetry is the hope that is present in all her collections. She guides us through tragedy, reassuring us but never romanticising the true nature of life.’

Bibliography

Poetry
 In Sickness: Poems (1995)
 A Furious Place (1996)
 Camping (1997)
 Cry for the Hot Belly (2000)
 The Sky Didn't Fall (2003)
 The Silence Came Close (2006)
 Only This Room (2009)
 Selected Poems (2011)
 The Ash and the Oak and the Wild Cherry Tree (2012)
 The Zebra Stood in The Night (2014)
 The Great Blue Whale (2017)

Novels
 Hannie Bennet's Winter Marriage (2000)
 The Bird Woman (2006)

Editor
editor, with Mark Roper, Ink Bottle: New Writing from Kilkenny (2001)

References

Further reading 

 Presented in the Missouri Review
 Missouri Biography
 Gallery Press Biography
 The Guardian Review
 Irish Times Review

Irish women novelists
Irish women poets
1951 births
Aosdána members
Living people
20th-century Irish novelists
20th-century Irish poets
20th-century Irish women writers
21st-century Irish novelists
21st-century Irish poets
21st-century Irish women writers
Alumni of the University of York
People from Bangor, County Down